Adrienne Clostre (9 October 1921 – 5 August 2006) was a French composer. She was born in Thomery, Seine-et-Marne, and studied at the Conservatoire de Paris with Yves Nat, Darius Milhaud, Jean Rivier and Olivier Messiaen.

After completing her studies, Clostre worked as a composer. She won the Grand Prix de Rome in 1949, the Grand Music Prize of the City of Paris in 1955, the Florence Gould Prize in 1976 and the SACD Prix Musique in 1987. Clostre married architect Robert Biset in 1951 and had two daughters. She died in Serrières.

Works
Selected works include:
Le chant du cygne
Lux mundi, children's orch, 1985
Modal Magic, 1986
Symphony for Strings, 1949
Concerto for oboe and chamber orchestra

References

1921 births
2006 deaths
20th-century classical composers
French classical composers
French women classical composers
People from Seine-et-Marne
Conservatoire de Paris alumni
Prix de Rome for composition
Pupils of Darius Milhaud
20th-century women composers
20th-century French women